The Living Daylights most commonly refers to:

 The living daylights, an archaic idiom referring to a person's vital senses
 The Living Daylights, a 1987 James Bond film.

It may also refer to:

"The Living Daylights"  (short story), a 1966 James Bond story by Ian Fleming
"The Living Daylights" (song), the theme song from the 1987 film, by A-ha
The Living Daylights (soundtrack), a soundtrack album from the 1987 film
The Living Daylights (video game), a 1987 computer game based on the film

See also 
 Living Daylights (disambiguation)